Yuuya Watanabe (渡辺雄也) is a Japanese Magic: The Gathering player and former World Champion. With five Pro Tour top eights and 27 Grand Prix top eights (including seven wins), Watanabe is best known for his Rookie of the Year title in 2007, and his Player of the Year titles in 2009 and 2012. He is one of only three players to become Player of the Year more than once. He was elected to the Magic: The Gathering Hall of Fame in 2016, along with Owen Turtenwald, but removed in May 2019 after a cheating scandal involving marked card sleeves.

Career 
Watanabe's professional Magic career began in 2007 at Grand Prix Kyoto. He emerged as the champion from a top eight of relatively unknown players, something former Player of the Year Kenji Tsumura had predicted on day one of the tournament. This qualified him for his first Pro Tour, Yokohama, held about a month later. Despite not making another top eight that season at either the Pro Tour or Grand Prix level, strong finishes at Pro Tour San Diego (22nd) with teammate Shuhei Nakamura, and at Pro Tour Valencia (21st) were enough for him to win the Rookie of the Year title.

The following season Watanabe did not perform as well on the Pro Tour, with a 35th-place finish at the World Championship being his best finish. However, off Tour he did have some stand-out finishes. A third place standing at the Japanese National Championship earned him a place on the Japanese national team. Along with his national team colleagues Masashi Oiso and Akihiro Takakuwa, Watanabe made the semifinals of the national team competition at Worlds, where Japan lost to the United States team.

In 2009, Watanabe achieved a strong season, though the first half was somewhat unimpressive. He was able to offset the deficit of earning only the minimum two Pro Points at Kyoto and Honolulu with a second-place finish behind Tomoharu Saitou at Grand Prix Kobe. The second half on the other hand was nothing short of spectacular, with Watanabe making the top eight in six consecutive premier level events. The run began with a second-place finish at Japanese Nationals behind his San Diego teammate Shuhei Nakamura. After this finish, Watanabe made the top eight of four back-to-back Grand Prix in Bangkok, Niigata, Prague, and Melbourne, winning the last of these. This gave him the lead in the player of the year race going into Pro Tour Austin, and made him the first non-Australian to win a Grand Prix in Australia. A year and a half after his Pro Tour debut, Watanabe made his first Pro Tour top eight at Pro Tour Austin. He lost his quarterfinal match in five games to Hunter Burton. After a 62nd-place finish at the next event, Grand Prix Tampa, Watanabe pick up right where he left off with another Grand Prix top eight in Kitakyushu. Despite not doing very well at the World Championship, finishing 101st individually and 7th with the Japanese team that were favourites to win the tournament, none of Watanabe's competitors for Player of the Year were able to capitalise, and he was awarded the title at the end of the tournament.

During the 2012 season, his most successful season yet, Watanabe reached three Grand Prix top 8s, winning two of them (Kuala Lumpur and Manila) and thus securing his participation, as the Japanese player with the most Pro Points, to the first Magic Players Championship, which he eventually won by defeating his fellow countryman Shouta Yasooka in the final. Since the tournament replaced the briefly retired Pro Player of the Year title, Watanabe also became the second Magic player after Kai Budde to earn this title more than once. Later that year, at Pro Tour Return to Ravnica, Watanabe got his second Pro Tour top eight, losing in the final to Stanislav Cifka. The next year's Players Championship was renamed to the World Championship, with Watanabe receiving an invitation as the winner of the Players Championship. He went on to finish 6th at the event.

At Grand Prix Beijing 2014, Watanabe won his seventh Grand Prix title, equalling the all-time record for Grand Prix wins held by Kai Budde. With seven Grand Prix wins in 21 total Grand Prix Top 8s, six more than Kai Budde, Watanabe was for a time the most successful Grand Prix player in the history of the game, until Shuhei Nakamura won GP Dallas in July 2015. His performance during the season earned him an invitation to the 2014 World Championship.

Watanabe started the next season strongly, making the top eight of the first Pro Tour of the 2014–15 season, Pro Tour Khans of Tarkir, where he lost in the quarterfinal to eventual champion Ari Lax. At the 2014 World Championship in December, Watanabe came close to becoming the first repeat World Champion, finishing the Swiss portion of the tournament in first place. However, it was his semifinal opponent Shahar Shenhar who would go on to claim his second Worlds title. He ended the season on 59 points, resulting in an eight-place finish in the Player of the Year standings, as well as an invitation to the 2015 World Championship. He was the only player to have qualified for the first 6 invite-only World Championships since the format change after the 2011 Pro Tour season. His streak was broken at the 2018 World Championship where he failed to qualify.

Watanabe was disqualified at Mythic Championship II for cheating by using marked card sleeves. After an investigation, Wizards of the Coast determined that he had intentionally marked several key cards in his deck, which would allow him to identify a card before drawing it and make decisions based on that information. As a consequence of this, they banned him from organized events for 30 months, removed him from the Magic Pro League, and removed him from the Magic: The Gathering Hall of Fame.

Achievements

Top 8 appearances 

Other accomplishments

 Pro Tour Rookie of the Year 2007
 Pro Tour Player of the Year 2009, 2012
 Magic: the Gathering World Champion 2012
 World Magic Cup Champion 2017

Notes 

 Watanabe has never won an event called the World Championship. However, the Players Championship, which he won in 2012, was later changed to the World Championship, and Watanabe is therefore considered the 2012 World Champion.

References

Japanese Magic: The Gathering players
Living people
Year of birth missing (living people)
People from Sagamihara
Players who have won the Magic: The Gathering World Championship